Naco School District 23  is a school district in Cochise County, Arizona.

References

External links
 

School districts in Cochise County, Arizona